Bedroom Farce is a 1975 play by British playwright Alan Ayckbourn. It had a London production at the National Theatre in 1977, transferring subsequently to the Prince of Wales Theatre.

Overview
Bedroom Farce is a comedy that contains a melee of events involving certain philandering characters, all occurring within similar moments of one another. Alan Ayckbourn’s clever uses of time and space makes this a very intricate and sophisticated comedy while also portraying the deteriorating and rebuilding of relationships among young couples. This play explores the differences in relationships between the younger and older generations while capitalizing on certain unlikely issues that may strain the relationships even further. Although Ayckbourn uses hints of homosexuality in this play, this doesn't seem to have a huge part in his play as a whole, but can be interpreted to have a stronger deeper meaning within the play. 
As the title implies, the play is an absurd and confusing farce, comparing and contrasting the differences between couples young and old, and the different troubles they encounter. This play had certain sadistic aspects involving cheating, and lying, which evolves into forgiveness and devotion. Although the play may seem to lead into a corner of despair and heartbreak, it substitutes the hard truths of certain relationships into relationships that may have a chance at survival.

Plot summary
The play takes place in three bedrooms during one night and the following morning. The cast consists of four married couples. At the beginning of the play, the oldest couple, Delia and Ernest, are getting ready to go out for a meal to celebrate their wedding anniversary; Malcolm and Kate, the youngest, are about to host a housewarming party, to which the other two couples, Jan and Nick and Susannah and Trevor (the only ones whose bedroom is not seen), have been invited. At the last minute Nick has hurt his back and is unable to go. The complicating factor is that Jan used to be Trevor's girlfriend, and after Susannah and Trevor have a blazing row, Susannah finds Trevor kissing Jan. As a result Susannah leaves the party and goes to visit Delia and Ernest, whose connection with the rest of the plot is that they are Trevor's parents; she ends up sharing Delia's bed, while Ernest is forced to sleep in the spare room. Meanwhile Trevor himself, feeling unable to go home, is also offered a bed in a spare room by Kate, but decides to go and "straighten things out" with Nick and Jan, leaving Kate waiting up for him.
Eventually Trevor and Susannah seem to be reconciled, but at the end of the play the audience might doubt whether this state of affairs will last.

Awards and nominations
 1979 Selection, The Burns Mantle Theater Yearbook, The Best Plays of 1978-1979

Major revivals

The play was revived in the West End in 2002 with a cast including June Whitfield and Richard Briers.

In 2008, the play was produced Off-Broadway by The Actors Company Theatre (TACT).

In 2009, the play was revived at the Rose Theatre by Peter Hall, co-director of the original London production in 1977.

In 2013, the play was revived at the Gate Theatre, Dublin.

In 2016 the play had a brief run at the Gordon Craig Theatre in Stevenage and starred Paul Lavers, Érin Geraghty and Gemma Oaten.

In other media
 The play was adapted for television in the UK in 1980, Ayckbourn himself writing the screenplay.  The cast included Michael Denison, Joan Hickson, Brenda Blethyn, and Stephen Moore.
 It was broadcast in two parts on BBC Radio 4 in 2022–2023. The cast was Stephen Mangan, Susannah Fielding, George Blagden, Laura Pitt-Pulford, Lisa Dillon, Edward Bennett, Rosalind Ayres and Martin Jarvis, who also directed.

References

External links
 Bedroom Farce on official Ayckbourn site
 
 

Plays by Alan Ayckbourn
1975 plays